Jimmy Siemers (born March 24, 1982) is a professional 3-event water skier.  He is currently on the MasterCraft Pro Ski Team and is a previous world record-holder in the jump event, with a 236-foot jump 66.8 meters.  He is a former member of the Arizona State University Water Ski Team, for which he won the trick event at collegiate nationals four times in his four years on the team.

Early life
Jimmy Siemers was born in Marshalltown, Iowa on March 24, 1982. He began water skiing at age four, and began competing at age of seven. He has also lived in Round Rock, Texas, and in his current residence of The 506, San Marcos, Tx.

College years
Jimmy Siemers attended Arizona State University, where he was a member of the ASU Water Ski Team. He majored in Communication, and graduated in 2006.  During his time on the ASU Ski Team, he won the trick event each of his four years, and was an All-American trick, jump, and overall throughout his college career. He also set a former collegiate trick record in his last tournament as a college student.

Pro Career Highlights
2005 U.S. Open Water Ski Championships - 2nd place
2005 Water Ski World Championships - Gold Medal, Men's Overall and Team Overall
2005 Water Ski National Championships - Open Men Jumping and Overall Champion
2005 MasterCraft Pro Water Ski Championships - Men's Tricks Champion
2005 Masters - 2nd place Men's tricks
2005 Collegiate All-Stars Water Ski Championships - Men's Tricks, Jumping and Overall Champion
2006 Masters - 1st place Men's tricks
2007 Men's Jump World Ranking= #13. Date: 00/10/22, Meters: 70.9 Location: Tri-Lakes Late Bloomer  	Zachary, La)

References
 Water Ski Mag
 USAWaterSki.org
 MasterCraft.com
 Water ski champs

1982 births
Sports world record setters
Living people
American water skiers
Walter Cronkite School of Journalism and Mass Communication alumni
Sportspeople from Marshalltown, Iowa